Mithakaspis is an extinct genus of arthrodire placoderm. Its fossils have been found in Craven Peak Beds, Australia.

References 

Arthrodire genera
Placoderms of Australia